The World Chessboxing Association (WCBA) is the governing body of chess boxing. The WCBA was founded in 2013 and has its headquarters in London, England. Its current president is Tim Woolgar who was the chess boxing UK champion at heavyweight.

History
The World Chessboxing Association split from World Chess Boxing Organization (WCBO) and it was established in 2013 by Tim Woolgar to accelerate developing chess boxing industry. The champions of WCBO are also sanctioned as the champions by WCBA.

Affiliates
UK Chessboxing Association
Spanish Chessboxing Association
Russian Chessboxing Organisation
Italian Chessboxing Federation
Indian Chessboxing Federation

See also

Chess boxing
World Chess Boxing Organization
List of Chess boxing champions

References

Chess boxing
Chess organizations
International organisations based in London
International sports organizations